Esha Singh (born 1 January 2005) is an Indian amateur shooter. She became the national champion in the 10m Air Pistol category in 2018 in 2018. She won silver medal at Junior World Cup at Suhl, Germany in 2019, two gold medals at Asian Junior Championships in 10m Air Pistol Women (AP60W) and 10m Air Pistol Mixed Team (APMIX). Besides 10m Air Pistol, she also competes in 25m Standard Pistol and 25m Pistol events.

Singh was also selected for India's core training team for the Tokyo Olympics.

Personal life and background 
Esha Singh was born to Sachin Singh and Srilatha on 1 January 2005 in Hyderabad, Telangana, India. Her father was a rally driver. Before she took up shooting, Singh tried go-karting, badminton, tennis and skating. A visit to the shooting range at Gachibowli Athletic Stadium in Hyderabad motivated her to choose air pistol. She trained at the stadium and simultaneously at her home, in the paper practice range built by her father. She later joined the Gun for Glory academy by former Olympic medallist Gagan Narang in Pune, Maharashtra.

Professional career 
Singh began shooting in 2014, and in 2015 became Telangana state champion in 10m air pistol category. Esha defeated Commonwealth Games and Youth Olympics gold-medalist Manu Bhaker and multi-medalist Heena Sidhu in 62nd National Shooting Championships at Thiruvananthapuram, Kerala by winning gold in 10m Air Pistol event and thus became the youngest champion in the senior category as a 13-year-old. She also won gold medals in youth and junior categories.

At the second edition of Khelo India Youth Games in January 2019, Singh won gold medal in the 10m Air Pistol event in the under-17 category. Esha won gold at Asian Airgun Championships in Taoyuan, Taiwan, in March–April, 2019 in the junior category of 10m Air Pistol event. At the ISSF Junior World Cup in July 2019 in Suhl, Germany, Esha won a silver medal in the 10m Air Pistol Women. She also won a bronze medal in the 10m Air Pistol Mixed Team event there. In 25m Standard Pistol and 25m Pistol events her ranking was 22 and 41 respectively. Singh went on to win individual and mixed team gold medals at Asian Shooting Championship in Doha, Qatar, in November 2019 in 10m Air Pistol (Junior) event.

Esha has been selected for the Indian core team for Tokyo Olympics. She had failed to finish among the top two to qualify for the Olympics in the qualification event held in February 2020. Postponement Tokyo Olympics gave her a chance to qualify.

In 2020, she received the Pradhan Mantri Rashtriya Bal Puraskar, a civilian award bestowed upon achievers under the age of 18.

References

Indian female sport shooters
Sportswomen from Hyderabad, India
2005 births
Living people
21st-century Indian women